The Kevin J. Duckworth Memorial Dock is a dock on the Willamette River, along Portland, Oregon's Eastbank Esplanade. The dock has served as a memorial to Kevin Duckworth since 2009. In 2016, the Oregon State Marine Board considered relocating the dock to Swan Island. The Human Access Project proposed additional improvements to the dock in 2017.

References

External links

 

Kerns, Portland, Oregon
Monuments and memorials in Portland, Oregon
Willamette River